Saviorz Day is the second official album by hip hop group Sunz of Man.

Track listing
"Intro"
"S.O.M."
Produced by Linx
"Ghettio" (featuring 12 O'Clock)
Produced by Linx
"Banksta'z" (featuring RZA and 12 O'Clock)
Produced by John the Baptist
"House of Blues" (featuring Madame D)
Produced by Joe Loops
"RZA Skit"
"Saviorz Day" (featuring Ghostface Killah and Madame D)
Produced by Fatal Son
"Black or White" (featuring Ancient Coins)
Produced by DATA 
"The Trinity" (featuring Omar Conry)
Produced by Linx
"Dear Psalms" (Hell Razah solo; featuring Smooth)
Produced by Linx
"People Change" (featuring MC Eiht and Madame D)
Produced by The Platinum Brothers
"Honey Tree" (featuring 12 O'Clock)
Produced by Joe Loops
"Time"
Produced by Linx
"Doin' Ya Thang" (featuring Makeba Mooncycle)
Produced by Joe Loopz
"Say, Say, Say" (featuring Ancient Coins)
Produced by DATA 
"Industry Skit"
"All We Got (US)" (featuring La the Darkman and Madame D)
Produced by Joe Loops
"The Cause (Outro)"

Sunz of Man albums
2002 albums